The MV Ocean Life was a cruise ship for a number of cruise lines, including Hellenic Seaways and Blue Ocean Cruises, under a number of names. She was sold for scrap in 2014.

History

She was built in 1981 as a Dmitriy Shostakovich-class ferry by Stocnia Szczecinska im A Warskiego, Szczecin, Poland as Lev Tolstoy for the Black Sea Shipping Company.  She was third in a series of seven near-identical ferries built for various shipping companies of the Soviet Union. She sailed under the names Natasha, Palmira, The Jasmine, Farah, EasyCruise Life and finally Ocean Life with Blue Open Cruise Lines, who operated her on a series of Indian coastal voyages.

Fate 
The ship was sold for scrapping at Aliağa, Turkey, in August 2014.

Incidents
The ship started taking on water and began to list five degrees. The vessel was moved to Western India Shipyard for repairs.

See also
 Dmitriy Shostakovich-class ferry

References

External links 

EasyCruise Life Cabins and Deckplans

Cruise ships
Passenger ships of the Soviet Union
1981 ships
Ships built in Szczecin
Ships of Black Sea Shipping Company